Brades (also Brades Estate) is a town and the de facto capital of Montserrat since 1998 with an approximate population of 1,000.

History
The still de jure capital of Montserrat at Plymouth in the south of the island was abandoned in 1997 after it was buried by the eruptions of the Soufriere Hills volcano in 1995. Interim government buildings have since been built at Brades, becoming the new temporary capital in 1998. The move is intended to be temporary, but it has remained the island's de facto capital ever since. Several names have been suggested for the new official capital now being constructed in the Little Bay area. These include Port Diana, in memory of Diana, Princess of Wales, ⁣ and St Patrick's, ⁣ to commemorate the 17 March Uprising and to attract Irish-American tourists.

Geography

Brades is located at the northwest end of Montserrat. It lies to the north of St Peter's and Bunkum Bay, in the vicinity of Carr's Bay and Little Bay. The main road of the island reaches its furthest north at Carr's Bay and then heads southeast, past the airport in the centre of the island. The village of Davy Hill lies off the main road in proximity to the northeast; The Collins River passes between the settlements and flows into Little Bay. To the northeast of Brades, in the centre, the island becomes hilly, reaching an elevation of 403 m at the peak of Silver Hill.

Economy
Brades contains several small shops, a bank, a branch of the Royal Bank of Canada on the Brades Main Road, government offices, a post office, a library, and a pharmacy. Runaway Travel, the largest and most comprehensive travel agency on Montserrat, is based in Brades. The firm Gas Grant Enterprises and Trading has its offices in Brades, as does Montserrat Airways and the Montserrat Tourist Board. The Attorney-General's Chambers are situated at 3 Farara Plaza in Brades. Eateries of note in the area include Soca Cabana, a beach shack on Little Bay which sells chicken and fish dishes with live reggae music on Friday nights, and Tina's on Brades Main Road which serves lobster burgers, garlic shrimp, coconut cream pie and ginger beer.

Education
Schools in Brades include:
 Brades Nursery (government)
 Brades Primary School (government)
 The Methodist Church built the school in 1966. Further additions and renovation were done by the Montserrat government. In 2009 the school was overpopulated; it had 151 students that year.
 St. Augustine Catholic Primary School (private)

Secondary students attend Montserrat Secondary School in Salem and sixth formers attend Montserrat Community College in Salem.

Demographics

Montserrat 2011 Housing and Population Census 

Source:

References

External links

 
Populated places in Montserrat
Capitals in the Caribbean
Capitals of British Overseas Territories